Brachylophosaurini is a tribe of saurolophine hadrosaurs with known material being from N. America and potentially Asia. It contains at least four taxa; Acristavus (from Montana and Utah), Brachylophosaurus (from Montana and Alberta), Maiasaura (also from Montana), and Probrachylophosaurus (also from Montana). A hadrosaur from the Amur river, Wulagasaurus, might be a member of this tribe, but this is disputed. The group was defined by Terry A. Gates and colleagues in 2011.

The clade Brachylophosaurini was defined as "Hadrosaurine ornithopods more closely related to Brachylophosaurus, Maiasaura, or Acristavus than to Gryposaurus or Saurolophus". In 2021, Madzia et al.  registered Brachylophosaurini in the PhyloCode and formally defined it as "The largest clade containing Brachylophosaurus canadensis but not Edmontosaurus regalis, Hadrosaurus foulkii, Kritosaurus navajovius and Saurolophus osborni".

See also
 Timeline of hadrosaur research

References

Saurolophines